Fie Østerby (born 10 May 1992) is a Danish professional racing cyclist, who currently rides for UCI Women's Continental Team.

References

External links

1992 births
Living people
Danish female cyclists
Place of birth missing (living people)
21st-century Danish women